I Am Fire and Air (Swedish: Jag är eld och luft) is a 1944 Swedish drama film directed by Anders Henrikson and starring Viveca Lindfors, Stig Järrel and Olof Widgren. It was shot at the Centrumateljéerna Studios in Stockholm and at the city's Grand Hotel. The film's sets were designed by the art director Bibi Lindström.

Cast
 Viveca Lindfors as Jenny Ahrman
 Stig Järrel as 	Pharmacist Edvind Franzen
 Anders Henrikson as Hegert
 Olof Widgren as 	Sven Dahl
 Hasse Ekman as 	Tore Ekström
 Olof Winnerstrand as 	Lennart Broberg
 Hilda Borgström as 	Augusta Condé
 Linnéa Hillberg as 	Mrs. Ahrman
 Åke Claesson as 	Ahrman, Jenny's Father
 Britta Brunius as 	Clara
 Jullan Kindahl as 	Mrs. Frida Sundelin
 Stina Ståhle as 	Actress at the theatre
 Hilding Gavle as 	Helge Brenner
 Kolbjörn Knudsen as 	Actor at the theatre
 Carl-Gunnar Wingård as 	Actor at the theatre
 Olga Appellöf as 	Ester, maid
 Renée Björling as 	Miss Schultze
 Bellan Roos as 	Linnéa
 Margaretha Bergström as 	Greta Linden 
 Göran Bernhard as 	Jenny's Son
 Gösta Gustafson as 	Erik Jans
 Emmy Albiin as 	Old woman selling flowers
 Karin Alexandersson as Café hostess 
 Carl Deurell as 	Party guest 
 Lars Ekborg as 	Helmsman 
 Erik Forslund as 	Janitor 
 Axel Högel as Veterinary 
 Stig Johanson as 	Shop assistant 
 Marianne Löfgren as Harlot
 Erik A. Petschler as 	Prompter
 Aurore Palmgren as 	Nurse

References

Bibliography 
 Qvist, Per Olov & von Bagh, Peter. Guide to the Cinema of Sweden and Finland. Greenwood Publishing Group, 2000.

External links 
 

1944 films
Swedish drama films
1944 drama films
1940s Swedish-language films
Films directed by Anders Henrikson
Swedish black-and-white films
Films shot in Stockholm
Films based on Swedish novels
1940s Swedish films